In pharmacology and pharmaceutics, a prototype drug is an individual drug that represents a drug class – group of medications having similar chemical structures, mechanism of action and mode of action. Prototypes are the most important, and typically the first developed drugs within the class, and are used as a reference to which all other drugs are compared.

Examples
 Morphine is the prototype of opioid analgesics
 Propranolol is the prototype of the beta blockers
 Chlorpromazine is the prototypical phenothiazine antipsychotic
 Imipramine is the prototypical tricyclic antidepressant, and itself a derivative of chlorpromazine
 Diazepam is the prototype of the benzodiazepine
 Diphenhydramine (Benadryl) is the prototype ethanolamine antihistamine
 Nifedipine is the prototype dihydropyridine calcium channel blocker
 Chloroquine is the prototypical antimalarial agent
 Acyclovir is the prototype antiviral agent that is activated by viral thymidine kinase
 Aspirin is the prototype NSAID

References

Pharmacodynamics
Medicinal chemistry
Pharmacological classification systems